The 2005–06 season was the 84th season in the existence of Deportivo Alavés, and the club's first season back in the top flight of Spanish football after winning promotion from the 2004–05 Segunda División. In addition to the domestic league, Alavés participated in this season's edition of the Copa del Rey. The season covered the period from 1 July 2005 to 30 June 2006.

First-team squad
Retrieved on 10 May 2021

Left club during season
Retrieved on 10 May 2021

Out on loan for the full season
Retrieved on 10 May 2021

Transfers

In

Out

Competitions

Overview

La Liga

League table

Results summary

Results by round

Matches

Copa del Rey

Statistics

Appearances and goals
Last updated on 30 March 2021.

|-
|colspan="10"|Players who have left the club after the start of the season:

|}

Goal scorers

References

Deportivo Alavés seasons
Deportivo Alavés